Conrad O'Sullivan (13 February 1981 – 23 March 2006) was an Irish rugby union player.

Life
Born in Cork, O'Sullivan first began playing rugby for local club Dolphin's under-10 side. He attended Presentation Brothers College, representing the school in the Munster Schools Senior Cup, before progressing to University College Cork and then joining Cork Constitution in the amateur All-Ireland League, whom he would go on to captain.

Having previously played for Munster at under-20 level, O'Sullivan was drafted in to play fly-half in Munster's pre-season friendly against Connacht on 29 August 2003, despite having previously played as a centre. Munster won 38–12, though O'Sullivan was injured in the game, which prevented him from making his senior competitive debut for the province until their game Neath-Swansea Ospreys on 27 September 2003.

Internationally, O'Sullivan represented Ireland Schools and Ireland under-21s. He died in March 2006.

References

External links
Munster Profile
Archived Celtic League Profile

1981 births
2006 deaths
People educated at Presentation Brothers College, Cork
Alumni of University College Cork
Rugby union players from County Cork
Irish rugby union players
Dolphin RFC players
Cork Constitution players
Munster Rugby players
Rugby union centres
Rugby union fly-halves